Scaredy Cat is a 1948 Warner Bros. Merrie Melodies cartoon directed by Chuck Jones. The short was released on December 18, 1948 and stars Porky Pig and Sylvester the Cat. The cartoon is notable in that it marks the first time the name "Sylvester" is used for the popular feline character. In previous shorts, the cat is unnamed, except for in the 1947 cartoon Tweetie Pie in which he is referred to as "Thomas".

Plot
Porky purchases a new home from a real estate agent, which turns out to be an old Gothic-style house. His pet cat Sylvester is frightened by the creepy-looking place, but Porky finds it "quaint" and "peaceful" and looks forward to his first night there. Sylvester is already holding onto the bottom of Porky's coat, unwilling to let go, when he is spooked by a bat and jumps inside the coat. Porky chastises him for being afraid of the bat and says he is going upstairs to bed while Sylvester will sleep in the kitchen. Unknown to Porky, Sylvester clings to him all the way to the bedroom and into bed. When Porky discovers him in the bed, he kicks him down the stairs, telling him to stay in the kitchen. Suddenly, Sylvester sees that the house is overrun with murderous mice who are in the process of carting off the previous owners' cat to be decapitated by a mouse wearing a black hood and holding an executioner's ax. Terrified, Sylvester races upstairs and hides in Porky's nightshirt. Porky begins scolding Sylvester, who interrupts this by demonstrating (in mime) what occurred downstairs. Porky criticizes the "ridiculous acting" and orders Sylvester back to the kitchen. Too frightened to comply, Sylvester pulls a gun from a dresser drawer and prepares to shoot himself in the head rather than face whatever fate the mice have in store for the pair. Porky disarms him and cannot believe how desperate his cat is.

Realizing he has no choice, Porky allows Sylvester to share the bed. Four mice push the bed out of the window and it sticks on a pole. Porky, half-asleep and thinking it is cold in the room, asks Sylvester to close the window. Sylvester proceeds to do so, himself barely awake and walking on thin air, as the pole springs the bed back into the room. Sylvester closes a tiny curtain on a birdhouse, gets back into the bed that is not there and falls to the ground. He comes through the bedroom door with a big lump on his head. At that moment, he sees that the mice are about to drop an anvil on Porky from a crawlspace above the bed. Sylvester grabs the anvil at the last moment. Porky awakes and sees Sylvester poised above him with it in his hands. Porky questions Sylvester's intentions before dropping it on the cat's head and leading the way back to the kitchen. Descending the staircase, Sylvester sees the hooded mouse roll a bowling ball down the banister, targeted directly at Porky, who has reached the bottom. Sylvester races down the stairs and shoves Porky out of the way so hard that the pig ends up in the kitchen headfirst in a laundry basket. Meanwhile, at the base of the staircase, Sylvester teeters and then falls to the floor unconscious after his head is flattened by the bowling ball intended for Porky.

Porky storms back from the kitchen (not noticing the basket being lowered below the floor) demanding to know why Sylvester pushed him. Seeing the cat knocked out, Porky suggests it is just a ploy to gain sympathy. Over the next few scenes, as he lifts Sylvester, carries him to the kitchen and puts him in the basket, an oblivious Porky barely escapes many attempts, via several tools and weapons, by the mice to kill him. Sylvester, out cold in the basket, is lowered below the floor just after 1:00 A.M. and is raised up again just before 4:00 A.M., without the basket and with the normally black portions of his fur having turned completely pale gray. Traumatized, he makes his way to Porky's room where he startles the pig awake with his gruesome appearance. Finally at his wits' end, Porky drags him downstairs, and goes into the kitchen by himself to show Sylvester there is nothing to fear. After a few seconds of silence, Sylvester looks in the kitchen and sees the mice parading as they did earlier with the other cat, only now it is Porky who bound and gagged and on his way to be decapitated. As the mice take him away, Porky holds up a sign that reads "YOU WERE RIGHT – SYLVESTER". Sylvester is horrified and immediately flees out of the house. As he rests to catch his breath, his conscience (a miniature Sylvester wearing a wizard's robe and carrying a star-tipped wand) appears. He magically produces an easel on which the word "coward" is written; then, with diagrams and charts, he reminds Sylvester how Porky raised him from a kitten, shows him the "comparative sizes" of a cat to a mouse, and demands that he return to the house to take action. Reinvigorated, Sylvester grabs a tree branch for use as a weapon, then decides to use the whole tree instead and races back into the mouse-infested house to fight. He sends the hundreds of murderous mice running for their lives, much to his conscience's delight.

With the mice now all supposedly gone for good, Porky graciously apologizes to Sylvester and thanks him for saving his life. One leftover mouse (the executioner) pops out of the longcase clock behind Sylvester, wielding a large wooden mallet. Seeing this, Porky yells at Sylvester to look out, but the mouse clobbers Sylvester on the head, knocking him unconscious, much to Porky's shock. The mouse then yanks off his hood, revealing that he has transformed into a Lew Lehr caricature wearing a Napoleonic-era bicorne hat. The snaggletoothed rodent then chuckles and declares, "Pussycats is the cwaziest peoples!"

Reception
In Jerry Beck's 2020 compendium The 100 Greatest Looney Tunes Cartoons, animator Yvette Kaplan expresses her admiration for this short's script as well as for its pairing of Porky and Sylvester:

Home video
VHS - The Looney Tunes Video Show Volume 3
LaserDisc - Looney Tunes After Dark
VHS - Looney Tunes: The Collectors Edition Volume 2 - "Running Amuck"
VHS - Porky Pig (1990)
VHS - Special Bumper Collection (Vol. 4) (U.K.)
DVD - Looney Tunes Golden Collection: Volume 1, Disc Two (original opening and credits restored)
DVD - Saturday Morning Cartoons: 1960s Volume 2, Disc One (part of The Porky Pig Show, without the opening and closing titles)
DVD, Blu-ray - Looney Tunes Platinum Collection: Volume 1

Notes
This is the first short in which the cartoon cat is referred to as "Sylvester", as prior to that he is either unnamed or, in the case of the 1947 release Tweetie Pie, is named "Thomas". Sylvester's name was based on the Latin scientific name for the European wildcat, Felis silvestris. This is also the first Sylvester cartoon directed by Chuck Jones.
This was the only one of five 1948 WB cartoons to get a Blue Ribbon reissue prior to 1956 and with the original credits cut. The others are Daffy Dilly, The Foghorn Leghorn, Kit for Cat, and You Were Never Duckier. Scaredy Cat is the latest-released cartoon to have its credits cut upon reissue. In 1998, for the "THIS VERSION" of the short, the original opening and credits were restored. This print was used on the Golden Collection, without the notice at the end.
This is the first of three Jones cartoons which placed Porky Pig and Sylvester (in a rare non-speaking role as Porky's pet) in a spooky setting where only Sylvester was aware of the danger, the other two films being Claws for Alarm (1954) and Jumpin' Jupiter (1955).
Parts of this cartoon were used in the 1977 Halloween TV special Bugs Bunny's Howl-oween Special.
The high-pitched yelling from the fleeing mice was re-used in Kiss Me Cat (1953), when the mouse family runs away from the "magnified" kitten Pussyfoot. The same track is also used in Forward March Hare (1952), when his fellow soldiers run for cover as Bugs uses an ammunition shell to nail his calendar to a wall. Interestingly, the former cartoon also depicts the cats as the heroes and the mice as the villains rather than vice versa, much like this cartoon. Both WB shorts were also directed by Jones.

References

External links

1948 films
1948 comedy films
1948 horror films
1948 animated films
1948 short films
1940s comedy horror films
American comedy horror films
Merrie Melodies short films
Porky Pig films
Sylvester the Cat films
Films about mice and rats
Films about suicide
Short films directed by Chuck Jones
Films scored by Carl Stalling
Warner Bros. Cartoons animated short films
1940s Warner Bros. animated short films
Films with screenplays by Michael Maltese
1940s English-language films